Korean stew may refer to 
Jjigae, a Korean dish similar to a Western stew.
Jeongol, a category of elaborate stews or casseroles in Korean cuisine